"Kinky Afro" is a single by English alternative rock band Happy Mondays, produced by Paul Oakenfold and Steve Osborne. It was the second single from the band's third album Pills 'n' Thrills and Bellyaches on 8 October 1990. The song's chorus paraphrases the Labelle song "Lady Marmalade".

The song was originally going to be called "Groovy Afro", but was changed to "Kinky Afro" after The Farm released a similarly named song titled "Groovy Train" earlier in 1990.

Release
The song was the band's biggest hit in the United States, reaching number one on the US Billboard Modern Rock Tracks chart. It reached number five in the United Kingdom, tied with "Step On" as the band's highest-charting single there. "Kinky Afro" was also the band's highest-charting single in Australasia, peaking at number 63 on Australia's ARIA Singles Chart and number 34 on New Zealand's Recorded Music NZ (then RIANZ) chart.

The music video was produced and directed by Keith Jobling of the Bailey Brothers.

Track listings
7-inch
 "Kinky Afro" (3:55)
 "Kinky Afro" (live) (4:36)

12-inch
 "Kinky Afro" (12" mix) (5:07)
 "Kinky Afro" (live) (6:38)

CD
 "Kinky Afro" (Radio Edit) (3:58)
 "Kinky Afro" (12" Mix) (5:08)
 "Kinky Afro" (live) (6:38)

Australian 12-inch
 "Kinky Afro" (Euromix) (7:26)
 "Kinky Afro" (Euromix edit) (4:15)
 "Step On" (US Dub mix) (5:55)

"Kinky Groovy Afro" 12-inch
 "Kinky Groovy Afro" (Peter Lorimer mix) (7:32)
 "Kinky Groovy Afro" (live) (6:38)

Source:

Charts

Certifications

See also
 List of Billboard number-one alternative singles of the 1990s

References

1990 singles
1990 songs
Factory Records singles
Happy Mondays songs